Days of Santiago is a 2004 Peruvian drama film directed by Josué Méndez. It was selected as the Peruvian entry for the Best Foreign Language Film at the 78th Academy Awards, but it was not nominated.

Cast
 Pietro Sibille as Santiago Roman
 Milagros Vidal as Andrea
 Marisela Puicón as Elisa
 Ricardo Mejía as Papa
 Lili Urbina as Mama
 Alheli Castillo as Mari

See also
 List of submissions to the 78th Academy Awards for Best Foreign Language Film
 List of Peruvian submissions for the Academy Award for Best International Feature Film

References

External links
 

2004 films
2004 drama films
Peruvian drama films
2000s Peruvian films
2000s Spanish-language films